Su Li-yang (born 27 December 2001) is a Taiwanese badminton player.

Career 
Su Li-yang's father Su Chih-ming was also a badminton player. Su Li-yang started to playing badminton when he was in the first grade of elementary school. Educated at the Datong High School, he had shown his potential as a excellent badminton player at several national and international tournaments. He also later studied at the University of Taipei. In 2017, at the age of 16, he reached the semi-finals of the senior international tournament Sydney International. He won his first international title at the 2018 Italian Junior International. In 2019, he won the Mongolia Junior international, and later settled for the bronze medal at the Asian Junior Championships. In 2022, he reached the finals of the Bonn International, Mongolia International and Bendigo International.

Achievements

Asian Junior Championships 
Boys' singles

BWF International (3 runners-up) 
Men's singles

  BWF International Challenge tournament
  BWF International Series tournament
  BWF Future Series tournament

BWF Junior International (2 titles, 3 runners-up) 
Boys' singles

  BWF Junior International Grand Prix tournament
  BWF Junior International Challenge tournament
  BWF Junior International Series tournament
  BWF Junior Future Series tournament

References

External links 

2001 births
Living people
Taiwanese male badminton players